Joël-Marie Fauquet (born 27 April 1942 at Nogent-le-Rotrou) is a French musicologist.

Life 
Fauquet studied applied arts before devoting himself to musicology and the social history of music. Director of research at the Centre national de la recherche scientifique, his work focuses on 19th century music. He was Vice-President of the French Society of Musicology from 1991 to 1996.

Among his works as a musicologist, are the catalogue raisonné of the work of Charles Tournemire in 1979, and the reconstitution of the version of Gluck's Orfeo ed Euridice, revised by Berlioz, in 2005.

Bibliography

Catalogues

Main work

Monographs

References 

1942 births
Living people
People from Nogent-le-Rotrou
20th-century French musicologists